Charles P. Gerba is an American microbiologist.  He currently is a professor at the University of Arizona. Dr. Gerba serves as a Spokesperson for Coverall Health-Based Cleaning System.

Work
Gerba is best known for work in environmental germ theory in the household.  His surveys produced scientific backing for two useful bits of everyday advice; in kitchens, a reused washcloth is likely to be the most infectious and germ-carrying object in a house.  In the bathroom, a flushed toilet with the seat up will spray germs into the air and disperse them throughout a room through a toilet plume.

Dr. Gerba is a Spokesperson for Coverall Health-Based Cleaning System. This collaborative relationship focuses on building public awareness about germs, the role they play in business environments and effective cleaning methods for infection control.

References

External links
 Faculty page at University of Arizona

Living people
American microbiologists
University of Arizona faculty
Year of birth missing (living people)